was an early anime creator.

Masaoka was the first to use cel animation and recorded sound in anime.  He worked at a number of companies as an animator and actor, and was one of the founders of what became Toei Animation. His work as a special effects artist earned him the title "Japanese Méliès."

He also did work under the pseudonym .

Famous animators who worked under him include Mitsuyo Seo and Yasuji Mori.

Filmography

References

External links

1898 births
1988 deaths
People from Osaka Prefecture
Japanese animators
Japanese film directors